Hawaii Five-O or Hawaii Five-0 may refer to:

 Hawaii Five-0 (2010 TV series), an American action police procedural television series
 Hawaii Five-O (1968 TV series), an American police procedural drama series produced by CBS Productions
 Hawaii Five-O (album), an instrumental album by the Ventures

See also
 Five-O (disambiguation)
 5O (disambiguation)
 50 (disambiguation)